Roland Lethem (born 1942) is a Belgian filmmaker and writer.

Influenced at his beginnings by Buñuel, Cocteau, the surrealists and by the Japanese cinema (Seijun Suzuki, Ishirō Honda, Kōji Wakamatsu, Yoko Ono), stunned by the Festival of the film expérimental of Knokke in 1967 and by May 1968, Roland Lethem wants to push the people to look at the things of which they say they are freed, it's to say to place them in front of their responsibilities. Even if sometimes the results leaves much to be desired, the idea of each one of his films is seductive and exemplary. A fact is
certain, his films are disturbing, they are sometimes unpleasant to look at. The narcissistic and provocative play of the debuts turned itself into direct, visual, and verbal insult, and in slandering. His dream was one moment to be able to film the intimate life of the pope or the sexual plays of the Belgian sovereigns. Through violence, pornography and cruelty of some scenes, Roland Lethem is a gentle, generous man with of a lot of humour. The work of Roland Lethem evolves, becomes political, ecological. La Ballade des amants maudits (The Ballad of the cursed lovers, 1966) or La Fée sanguinaire (The Bloodthirsty Fairy, 1968) still tell stories. Les Souffrances d'un oeuf meurtri (The Sufferings of a ravaged Egg, 1967), poem of love in several parts (Étoiles/Stars, Corps/Bodies, Hymen/Marriage or Hymen (ambiguous in French), Oeuf/Egg) dedicated to all who conceive and to all who are conceived, irresistibly makes you think at the Histoire de l'oeil (Story of the Eye, 1928)  of Georges Bataille.

Some of the titles of his films include Le Saigneur est avec nous and Le sexe enragé. There are several thorough studies published on his films (Cinema/London, Skoop/Amsterdam) and
Bandes de cons! (Bunch of Assholes!, 1970), his most famous film, was the subject of a seminar at the University of Amsterdam.

He frequently collaborated with Jean-Pierre Bouyxou and Jio Berk.

Awards

La Double Insomnie & Lili au Lit.  Prix M. Fraikin for originality of cinematographic language at 2nd Prix du Jeune Cinéma Belge, La Louvière 1966.

Les Souffrances d'un Œuf Meurtri  Selected for the 4th Compétition Internationale du Film Expérimental, Knokke 1967—68, 3rd Prize of  Jeune Cinéma Belge. La Louvière 1968, Sélectionné au Festival d'Oberhausen, 1968

La Fée Sanguinaire. Prix d'Excellence of  Ciné-Club Europa, Bruxelles 1969 Sélectionné au Festival d'Oberhausen 1969, invitation to Underground Festival  of London 1971

Le Sexe Enragé "One Night Stand Award" at the first Wet Dream Film Festival d'Amsterdam, 197, invited to the   Biennale underground de Venise 1971; invited to the  Underground Festival  of London 1971

Le Vampire de la Cinémathèque invitations to the Quinzaine des Réalisateurs, Cannes 1971,  Underground Festival  of London 1971, and  Festival der Struktural Film, Hamburg 1972

Le Saigneur est avec Nous : "Prix de la Presse—Lucien Deroisy" at the 10th Festival National du Cinema Belge, Bruxelles 1974

A group of films : Festival "Sigma", Bordeaux,: invitation to the Journées du Film Surréaliste, Toulon 1974

Le Sexe Enragé & La Fée Sanguinaire: I: invitations to the Festival du Film Tabou, Amsterdam~Utrecht, 1980,  Festival de l'Imaginaire et de la Science—Fiction à Madrid, 1980,  &  Journées du Film Anarchiste, Gent, 1981

His work as a whole : Awarded a special Prize by l'Académie Morlock, Paris, 1980

References

Reviews and commentary on his work in periodicals

 1971 : "De Invloed van het Lezen van een Filmkritiek op de beoordeling van de betreffende Film" (Psychologisch Laboratorium de l'Université d'Amsterdam, à propos d'une projection de "Bande de Cons !’)
 1972 : Cinéma (n° 8) pp 20–24, by Mike Wallington (London)
 1972 : Skoop (n° 8, vol 7) pp 19–24 by Willum Thijssen (Amsterdam)
 1976 : Ciné—Dossiers n°54, pp 13–16 by Francis Bolen (Bruxelles)
 1979 : 4 Millions 4 (n° 208/209) by Philippe Buss (Bruxelles)

in Books
 Le Cinéma Fantastique, by  René Prédal (Seghers)
 La Science-Fiction au Cinéma, by Jean-Pierre Bouyxou (10/18)
 El Cine de Siencia Ficcion, by Luis Gasca
 Le Cinéma en Belgique, by Paul Davay (Duculot)
 The Experimental Cinema, by David Curtis (Studio—Vista)
 Film Is, by Stephen Dwoskin
Film as a Subversive Art, by  Amos Vogel (Weidenfeld & Nicolson)
Le Cinéma, Art Subversif (Buchet—Chastel)— Éloge du Cinéma Expérimental, Dominique Noguez (Beaubourg) — Le Masochisme au Cinéma, Jean Streff (Veyrier) — Le Sexe à l'Ecran, Gérard Lenne (Veyrier) — Dracula, les Vampires au Cinéma, Barrie Pattisson (Minoustch) — Histoire authentique, anecdotique, folklorique et critique du Cinéma Belge depuis ses plus lointaines origines, Francis Bolen (Mémo et Codec)

External links
 
Photography of Roland Lethem in Lausanne Underground Film and Music Festival

Belgian film directors
1942 births
Living people